
Frank Weston Benson made Murals as well as portraits, waterscapes, wildlife, landscapes and other works of art.

Benson was commissioned by the Library of Congress of the United States in the 1890s; he completed murals of the Four Seasons and Three Graces for the project.

Murals

Notes

References

Bibliography

External links

Frank Weston Benson
19th-century murals